The Toreatae (Greek: , Strabo xi. 2. 11) or Toretae (Greek: , Steph. B. s. v.; Dionys. Per. 682; Plin. vi. 5; Mela, i. 2; Avien. Orb. Terr. 867) were a tribe of the Maeotae in Asiatic Sarmatia. Strabo describes them as living among the Maeotae, Sindi, Dandarii, Agri, Arrechi, Tarpetes, Obidiaceni, Sittaceni, Dosci, and Aspurgiani, among others. (xi. 2. 11) 

The Toreatae were one of the Maeotae tribes, who lived in the 1st millennium BC on the eastern and south-eastern coast of the Azov sea. Russian archeologists, historians and ethnographers in the Soviet period concluded that Maeotae was one of the names of the tribes of the Adyghe people (or Circassians): in the Great Soviet Encyclopedia (in the article Adyghe people)  was written:Living in the basin of the river Kuban were some of the tribes of the (Adyghe people), who generally were given the collective name "Maeotae" by ancient historians.

The Maeotae, engaged in farming and fishing, were thought by other Soviet writers to be a mixture of speakers of Adyghe language and an Iranian language. In the 4th–3rd centuries BC many of them were incorporated into the Bosporan kingdom.

References

 Strabo's book 11 on-line

Peoples of the Caucasus
History of the North Caucasus
Ancient history of the Caucasus
Kabardino-Balkaria
Ancient Circassian tribes